Pteridotelus is a genus of beetles in the family Cerambycidae, containing the following species:

 Pteridotelus hematopus (Lameere, 1884)
 Pteridotelus laticornis White, 1855
 Pteridotelus pupillatus Lacordaire, 1872

References

Acanthoderini